Rudy Adrien Camacho (born 5 March 1991) is a French professional footballer who plays as a defender for Major League Soccer club CF Montréal.

Club career
He began playing youth football with Lille, before moving to CAS Cheminots d’Oullins and then Nancy.

He began his senior career with Nancy B.

In 2012, he joined Lyon-Duchère.

In 2014, he moved to Sedan.

In 2016, he joined Belgian First Division A club Waasland-Beveren.

In March 2018, he signed with Canadian club Montreal Impact in Major League Soccer. In 2021, he was named the team's Defensive Player of the Year. In February 2022, he extended his contract with the club.

Career statistics

Honours
CF Montréal
Canadian Championship: 2019; 2021

Notes

References

External links
 

1991 births
Living people
Sportspeople from Rhône (department)
French footballers
Association football defenders
AS Nancy Lorraine players
Lyon La Duchère players
CS Sedan Ardennes players
S.K. Beveren players
CF Montréal players
Championnat National 2 players
Championnat National players
Belgian Pro League players
Major League Soccer players
French expatriate footballers
Expatriate footballers in Belgium
French expatriate sportspeople in Belgium
Expatriate soccer players in Canada
French expatriate sportspeople in Canada
Footballers from Auvergne-Rhône-Alpes